Verdant may refer to:
 Verdant Green, fictional undergraduate at Oxford University
 Verdant Power, maker and installer of tidal power and hydroelectric systems
 Verdant universities, an informal group of Australian universities founded in the 1960s and 1970s.